John Peter Vukasin Jr. (May 25, 1928 – September 20, 1993) was a United States district judge of the United States District Court for the Northern District of California.

Education and career
He was born in Oakland, California. He received an Artium Baccalaureus degree from the University of California, Berkeley in 1950 and a Juris Doctor from the University of California, Berkeley School of Law in 1956. He was in the United States Army from 1951 to 1953. He was a trial attorney of the Division of Highways, Department of Public Works, State of California from 1956 to 1957. He was in private practice in San Francisco, California in 1958, and in Oakland from 1959 to 1968. He was a Commissioner of the California Public Utilities Commission from 1969 to 1974. He was a judge of the California Superior Court from 1974 to 1983.

Federal judicial service
On September 13, 1983, Vukasin was nominated by President Ronald Reagan to a seat on the United States District Court for the Northern District of California vacated by Judge Stanley Alexander Weigel. Vukasin was confirmed by the United States Senate on September 20, 1983, and received his commission the same day. He served until his death of cancer, on September 20, 1993, exactly ten years to the day after he received his commission.

References

Sources

1928 births
1993 deaths
20th-century American judges
20th-century American lawyers
California state court judges
Judges of the United States District Court for the Northern District of California
American people of Serbian descent
UC Berkeley School of Law alumni
Superior court judges in the United States
United States district court judges appointed by Ronald Reagan
United States Army personnel